The Rehovot subdistrict is one of Israel's subdistricts in Central District. The district is composed of mostly of the Western half of Mandatory Ramle Subdistrict.

The principal city of the subdistrict is, as the name implies, Rehovot.

References